Shrapnel: The Official BattleTech Magazine is a magazine covering various BattleTech topics such as short fiction and campaign scenarios. The first issue was released in June 2020 by Catalyst Game Labs. Various BattleTech authors have appeared in the issues, such as Michael A. Stackpole and Blaine Lee Pardoe. It was a created after Catalyst Game Labs reached a stretch goal in a Kickstarter campaign. It has been called a spiritual successor to the original BattleTechnology magazine from the 1990s. The magazine is helmed by John Helfers and Philip A. Lee.

Authors 

Below are a list of authors who have appeared in Shrapnel Magazine.

Michael A. Stackpole
Blaine Lee Pardoe
Loren L Coleman
Bryan Young
Julian Michael Carver
Keith R. A. DeCandido
Kevin Killiany
Jason Schmetzer
Tom Leveen
Aaron Cahall
Craig A. Reed, Jr.
Eric Salzman

References

BattleTech
Magazines established in 2020